Cerautola crippsi is a butterfly in the family Lycaenidae. It is found in Uganda, Cameroon and Kenya.

The larvae are found on the bark of trees, usually in fairly open country. Although Crematogaster ants are always present, they do not appear to attend the larvae. The larvae probably feed on lichens.

Subspecies
Cerautola crippsi crippsi (eastern Uganda, western Kenya)
Cerautola crippsi teresae Libert, 2015 (northern Cameroon)

References

Butterflies described in 1934
Poritiinae
Butterflies of Africa